Simplemente... La Mejor is a compilation album by Regional Mexican singer Jenni Rivera, released in 2004. It came with a bonus DVD.

Track listing
 Querida Socia
 Las Malandrinas 
 Se las Voy a Dar a Otro
 Cuando Abras los Ojos
 Chicana Jalisciense
 Que Me Entierren con La Banda
 Se Marcho
 Mi Vida Loca
 Tristeza Pasajera (Ilusion Pasajera)
 Angel Baby
 Reina de Reinas
 La Chacalosa
 Las Mismas Costumbres (new version)
 Amiga Si Lo Ves (new version) 
 Simplemente La Mejor (new version)
 Las Mismas Costumbres (norteña version)
 Amiga Si Lo Ves (norteña version) 
 Amiga Si Lo Ves (pop version)

DVD
 Las Malandrinas (video) 
 Se las voy a Dar a Otro (video) 
 A Escondidas (video)
 Que Me Entierren con La Banda (video featuring Lupillo Rivera)
 Photo Gallery
 Biography

References

2004 compilation albums
Jenni Rivera compilation albums
Univision Music Group albums
Spanish-language compilation albums
Jenni Rivera video albums
Music video compilation albums